NNPDF is the acronym used to identify the parton distribution functions from the NNPDF Collaboration. NNPDF parton densities are 
extracted from global fits to data based on a combination of a Monte Carlo method for uncertainty estimation and the use of 
neural networks as basic interpolating functions.

Methodology 

The NNPDF approach can be divided into four main steps:
 The generation of a large sample of Monte Carlo replicas of the original experimental data, in a way that central values, errors and correlations are reproduced with enough accuracy.
 The training (minimization of the ) of a set of PDFs parametrized by neural networks on each of the above MC replicas of the data. PDFs are parametrized at the initial evolution scale  and then evolved to the experimental data scale  by means of the DGLAP equations. Since the PDF parametrization is redundant, the minimization strategy is based in genetic algorithms as well as gradient descent based minimizers.
 The neural network training is stopped dynamically before entering into the overlearning regime, that is, so that the PDFs learn the physical laws which underlie experimental data without fitting simultaneously statistical noise.
 Once the training of the MC replicas has been completed, a set of statistical estimators can be applied to the set of PDFs, in order to assess the statistical consistency of the results. For example, the stability with respect PDF parametrization can be explicitly verified.

The set of  PDF sets (trained neural networks) provides a representation of the underlying PDF probability density, from which   any statistical estimator can be computed.

Example 

The image below shows the gluon at small-x from  the NNPDF1.0 analysis, available
through the LHAPDF interface

Releases 
The NNPDF releases are summarised in the following table:

All PDF sets are available through the LHAPDF interface and in the NNPDF webpage.

External links
The NNPDF Collaboration homepage
Download NNPDF Parton Distribution sets
The NNPDF1.0 analysis
The NNPDF Non-Singlet analysis
NNPDF3.1 release
NNPDF latest fitting code
The LHAPDF interface

Computational particle physics
Physics software